The F50 (or N50 as it is known in North America) is a 35mm film SLR camera which was introduced by Nikon in 1994.  It was aimed at the lower end of the amateur autofocus SLR market.

The F50 features autofocus, TTL light metering and various "programs" (ranging from manual operation to a highly automated point and shoot mode). It could not however meter with non-CPU lenses.

It was replaced by the similarly-priced F60 (also known as the N60) in 1998.

History
A variant known as the F50D or N50D, which added a date/time-imprinting facility and also panoramic mode.

Design
The F50 body was made from polycarbonate and metal, and available in both "champagne silver" and black.

Notable omissions include depth-of-field preview and any form of remote shutter release.

Specifications

Photos

References

F050
F050
F050